Leontina Vukomanović (born 13 November 1970), known mononymously as Leontina, is a Serbian singer, blogger, composer and songwriter.

Biography
She started with professional music in school days (secondary music school Josip Slavenski, 1986, when she published her first songs and for whom she entrusted protection to SOKOJ). Parallel to education at the Faculty of Music in Belgrade (1989–1993) she participated as a composer and songwriter in the domestic Eurovision Song Contest '91. and '92. and as a vocal soloist she won awards for interpretation at the festivals Mesam and Belgrade Spring '92. year with his own compositions.

In 2004, she wrote lyrics for song "Lane moje", performed by Serbian musician Željko Joksimović at the Eurovision Song Contest 2004 representing Serbia and Montenegro.

Discography
Studio albums:

 Nemiri (Lucky Sound, GETEX, N-estrada, 1996)
 Ljubav bez ljubavi (City Records, 1998)
 Za decu (PGP-RTS, 1998)
 Sledeća (City Records, 2001)
 Pesme za decu (City Records, 2008) - together with Ivana Peters

References

Serbian composers
Serbian songwriters
Women composers
Women songwriters
Serbian bloggers
Serbian women bloggers
1970 births
Living people
Musicians from Požarevac
20th-century Serbian women singers
Beovizija contestants